Diogo Henrique Sodré (born 21 March 1991) is a Brazilian footballer who plays for Cypriot club Onisilos Sotira as an attacking midfielder.

Club career
Born in São José dos Campos, São Paulo, Sodré finished his formation with Santo André. In 2010, he moved to Cruzeiro, being subsequently loaned to Poços de Caldas and Patrocinense.

In the 2011 summer, after representing Concórdia and Paulista, Sodré moved abroad for the first time in his career, joining El Jaish SC. After scoring 33 goals under the course of three campaigns he returned to Brazil, signing a three-year deal with Coritiba on 4 January 2014.

On 11 August 2014 Sodré was loaned to Bragantino, until the end of the year. He made his professional debut on the 23rd, coming on as a late substitute in a 0–1 away loss against Paraná for the Série B championship.

References

External links
Coritiba official profile 

Diogo Sodré at CFA

1991 births
Living people
People from São José dos Campos
Brazilian footballers
Brazilian expatriate footballers
Association football midfielders
Esporte Clube Santo André players
Cruzeiro Esporte Clube players
Paulista Futebol Clube players
Coritiba Foot Ball Club players
Clube Atlético Bragantino players
Luverdense Esporte Clube players
Clube do Remo players
El Jaish SC players
Onisilos Sotira players
Campeonato Brasileiro Série B players
Campeonato Brasileiro Série C players
Qatar Stars League players
Expatriate footballers in Qatar
Expatriate footballers in Cyprus
Brazilian expatriate sportspeople in Qatar
Brazilian expatriate sportspeople in Cyprus
Footballers from São Paulo (state)